This is a list of Armenian royal consorts.

Kingdom of Armenia

Ancient Armenian queens 
Rodogune of Persia, daughter of King Artaxerxes of Persia, wife of Orontes II
Antiochis, sister of Antiochus III the Great, wife of Xerxes
Satenik of the Alans, daughter of the king of the Alans, wife of Artaxias I
Cleopatra of Pontus, daughter of Mithridates VI of Pontus, wife of Tigranes II the Great
Erato of Armenia, half-sister and wife of Tigranes IV; queen regnant
Zenobia, daughter of Mithridates of Armenia, and wife of Rhadamistus
Ashkhen, wife of Tiridates III of Armenia
Pharantzem, wife of Arsaces II (Arshak II)
Zarmandukht, wife of Papas (Pap); queen regnant

Bagratuni dynasty, 862–1045

Armenian Kingdom of Cilicia

Princess consort of Armenia, Lady of the Mountains

Rubenid dynasty, 1080–1198

Queen consort of Armenia

Rubenid dynasty, 1198–1252

Hethumid dynasty, 1252–1341

Lusignan dynasty, 1341–1375

See also
Princess of Antioch
List of Latin empresses

Notes

Sources

Armenia
 
Queens
Armenia